Municipal elections were held in Bosnia and Herzegovina on 15 November 2020 to elect mayors and assemblies in 143 municipalities. Originally scheduled for 4 October, they were postponed due to a lack of funds.

Occurring under the backdrop of the ongoing COVID-19 pandemic, they came less than a year following the delayed formation of the state government. National coalition partners and the hegemonic Bosniak, Serb and Croat political parties, the Party of Democratic Action (SDA), Alliance of Independent Social Democrats (SNSD) and Croatian Democratic Union (HDZ), respectively, each defended the most number of positions.

A total of 3,283,194 citizens of Bosnia and Herzegovina were registered to vote – almost on par with the total population of the country, 3,531,159 at the 2013 census – pointing to issues of outdated data in the voters' registry.

Out of 425 mayoral candidates, 29 were women. Only 4 women were elected mayors, down from 7.

Electoral system
Municipal elections in Bosnia and Herzegovina comprise the election of a mayor and municipal assembly across the 143 municipalities of Republika Srpska and the Federation of Bosnia and Herzegovina. They are governed by the Law on Elections.

Mayors are elected by a first-past-the-post system, with the candidate receiving the plurality of votes winning. For this reason, multi-party coalitions are more common at the mayor level, with a united political or ethnic slate presented in situations where several candidates may divide the electorate. Assembly elections use open list proportional representation, with the number of assembly members varying by population.

Sarajevo and Istočno Sarajevo are further subdivided into four and six municipalities which also elect assemblies and then, indirectly, mayors. The Brčko District is considered an independent self-administrative unit, electing an assembly which in turn selects a mayor.

Electoral campaign

Electoral issues dominated the Bosnian public sphere across September and October, although the electoral campaign officially started only on 16 October. Political parties held large rallies, despite growing COVID-19 cases (over 50,000 cases and 1,234 deaths by 31 October) and in violation of health and safety regulations.

According to Transparency International in Bosnia and Herzegovina (TI BIH), political parties spent almost one million BAM on video production and advertising in TV and print media in the first two weeks of campaign. Almost the entire amount was spent by the main six parties, with the largest share by Banja Luka-based SNSD (351,357) and PDP (325,852 KM). 
Transparency International also recorded multiple examples of abuse of administrative resources by parties in power for electoral purposes.

In Velika Kladuša, outgoing mayor and convicted war criminal Fikret Abdić, under arrest since June for abuse of office, was released to allow him to carry out electoral campaign.

The international High Representative for Bosnia and Herzegovina, Valentin Inzko, noted that the election campaign was "characterized by divisive, negative rhetoric that deepens existing divisions and makes reconciliation in Bosnia and Herzegovina increasingly difficult."

The Central Electoral Commission (CIK) fined several parties for illicit activities before the formal start of the electoral campaign. 
On 7 October, the CIK banned from elections the United Srpska and fined it BAM 10,000 for diffusion of a video on social media deemed as spreading ethnic hatred.
On 15 October, the Court of Bosnia and Herzegovina annulled such decision, as it deemed that the legal provisions referred to by the CIK (Election Law) did not apply to the period ahead the formal start of the electoral campaign. The video continued to be shared by the party on social media in the following weeks.

The number of voters registers from abroad soared to 101,771, alarming judicial institutions to the risk of fraud. The CIK received over 3,500 reports of suspected fraud, particularly in relation to Srebrenica and Brčko. To facilitate the identification of such cases, on 8 October the CIK published on its website the liste of registered mail-in voters, including names and addresses, allowing all citizens to identify and report suspected irregularities. On 14 October the BiH Agency for the Protection of Personal Data requested the removal of the list of registered mail-in voters from the CIK website, citing privacy concerns.

The CIK rejected over 27,000 received applications for voting from abroad and reported suspect cases of fraud to the State-level BiH Prosecutor's Office, which however on 12 October indicated that it rejected jurisdiction on them and advised the CIK to address local judicial institutions.

The local elections were observed remotely by the Council of Europe.

Results

Turnout reached 50%. Governing parties in each communities (Bosniak SDA and Bosnian Serb SNSD) had a lacklustre showing, and opposition candidates won in Sarajevo as well as, unexpectedly, in Banja Luka and Bijeljina. Party leaders (Bakir Izetbegović and Milorad Dodik respectively) acknowledged the loss. Results in Srebrenica remain unclear due to the high number of absentee and postal ballots.

In the Bosnian capital Sarajevo, in its municipality of Centar, the candidate of the opposition coalition Srđan Mandić (Our Party) obtained almost two thirds of the votes. Opposition candidates won 4 municipalities out of 9. Experienced politician, Social Democrat Bogić Bogićević was poised to be elected the next mayor of the city of Sarajevo in the coming weeks by the City Council. In parallel, the alliance of the four opposition parties also initiated the reshuffle process of the government of the Sarajevo Canton, which they controlled with good results for the first time in 2019, but which returned in March 2020 in the hands of the SDA.

In Zenica the outgoing mayor, the independent Fuad Kasumović, keeps the town hall; the SDA candidate, Deputy Minister of Justice Nezir Pivić got only second. Also in Tuzla, the Social Democrat Jasmin Imamović – the longest-serving mayor of Bosnia, in power since 2001 – maintains control of the cantonal capital, resulting in the lead in all polling stations in town.
In Velika Kladuša the outgoing mayor, war criminal Fikret Abdić, seems to have been reconfirmed, even if only with a very narrow margin on challenger Jasmin Hušić. 
The elections might have to be repeated in Travnik, where the winning candidate, Mirsad Peco (SDA), died from COVID-19 on the same day as the vote. 
Finally, in Mostar, voting will only take place on 20 December, for the first time since 2008.

In the Republika Srpska entity, 27-year-old opposition candidate Draško Stanivuković (PDP) won the majority of votes for the post of City mayor of Banja Luka over the outgoing Igor Radojičić (SNSD), a loyalist of Dodik. Stanivuković created a public profile lambasting nepotism and corruption of the ruling party, as well as showing himself closer to the demands of the "Justice for David" movement. Dodik's party had ruled the Bosnian Serb capital since 1998.

The SNSD, with Dalibor Pavlović, instead gains the municipality of Prijedor, a fiefdom of his allied DNS party, now in crisis; that of Doboj, where the previous mayor aligned himself with the SNSD in 2018; and that of Trebinje, where Dodik has promised the construction of an airport – financed by Belgrade.
In Srebrenica, waiting for the postal votes, the outgoing mayor, Serb Mladen Grujičić, a denier of the genocide, is ahead of just 600 votes; Bosniak parties, which count on at least 1600 postal votes, have declared victory for their candidate Alija Tabaković. The count is set to continue for the whole week.
Finally, in Bijeljina the outgoing mayor Mićo Mićić, in power since 2004, had aligned himself with Dodik, being expelled from the SDS party; he unexpectedly lost his seat to opposition candidate Ljubiša Petrović (SDS/PDP). However, Dodik's coalition obtained a majority in the city council.

Mayoral

Federation of Bosnia and Herzegovina

Republika Srpska

Assembly of Brčko District 
There are 31 seats in the Assembly of the Brčko District. The seats are divided as follows as of 2020:

Notes

See also 

 2020 Mostar municipal elections, held on 20 December 2022

References

External links

Elections in Bosnia and Herzegovina
Bosnia
2020 in Bosnia and Herzegovina
Municipal elections in Bosnia and Herzegovina